Good Morning, Eve! is a 1934 Vitaphone short comedy film released by Warner Brothers on September 22, 1934 in the three-strip Technicolor process ("Process No. 4"). Its release received little attention.

Cast
Leon Errol as Adam
June MacCloy as Eve
Vernon Dent as Emperor Nero
Maxine Doyle as Queen Guinevere

Plot
Adam and Eve are in the Garden of Eden debating whether to eat an apple despite the serpent's warning. After their meal, they take a stroll through time. Along the way, they stop for musical interludes, including in the gardens of Emperor Nero of Rome circa 100 AD, in King Arthur's court, and at a beach resort in modern times.

References

External links

Stills at cinemedioevo.net

1934 films
Warner Bros. films
Cultural depictions of Adam and Eve
1934 comedy films
1934 short films
American comedy short films
Films directed by Roy Mack
American musical comedy films
Films about time travel
1930s American films